The 2016 WNBA season is the 20th season for the Los Angeles Sparks of the Women's National Basketball Association. The season tipped off on May 15. The Sparks finished with a record of 26–8, second in the Western Conference (and the league as a whole), and advanced to the WNBA Finals, which they won, three games to two, against the Minnesota Lynx. It was the team's first title since 2002.

WNBA Draft

The Sparks made three selections in the 2016 WNBA Entry Draft in Uncasville, Connecticut:

After selecting Talia Walton, the Sparks waived her on May 11, 2016.  The Sparks also waived draft pick Whitney Knight on August 30, 2016.

Roster

Standing

Western Conference

Game log

Pre-season

|- style=
|1
| May 7
|
| 
|
| 
|
| 
|
|- style=
|2
| May 9
|
| 
|
| 
|
| 
|
|- style=
|3
| May 10
|
| 
|
| 
|
| 
|

Playoffs

|- style=
|1
| September 28
| Chicago Sky
| 
| Candace Parker (30)
| Nneka Ogwumike (10)
| Nneka Ogwumike (6)
| Walter Pyramid
| 
|-
|- style="background:#bfb;"
| 2
| September 30
| Chicago Sky
|
| Candace Parker (20)
| Candace Parker (11)
| Candace Parker (8)
| Staples Center
|
|- style="background:#bfb;"
| 3
| October 2
| @ Chicago Sky
| 
| Nneka Ogwumike (22)
| Candace Parker (15)
| Candace Parker (6)
| Allstate Arena
|
|-
|- style="background:#bfb;"
| 4
| October 4
| @ Chicago Sky
| 
| Candace Parker
| Nneka Ogwumike
| Chelsea Gray
| Allstate Arena
| 
|-

The Sparks qualified for the 2016 playoffs, and, as the team with the second-best regular season record in the WNBA, received two automatic byes, advancing straight to the best-of-five semifinal.

Statistics

Regular season

Awards and honors

References

External links

Los Angeles Sparks seasons
Los Angeles
Los Angeles Sparks
Women's National Basketball Association championship seasons